The nonprofit Ferndale Museum, located in Ferndale, California, houses and exhibits artifacts, documents and papers from settlement during the California Gold Rush to the present including an active Bosch-Omori seismograph. The area of collection covers the lower Eel River Valley as far south as the Mattole River Valley and west to the Pacific Ocean. Collections include over 8,000 photographs, back issues of the Ferndale Enterprise newspaper, and family papers spanning 150 years.

History 
The museum was founded on September 22, 1979 after a two-year period of renovating an existing building to house its collection. It has always been located on Shaw Street, Ferndale.

Collection

Domestic Exhibits

Historical exhibits include a simulated town street, where visitors can look through windows and doors of what could have been homes and businesses in late 1800s to early 1900s.

Technology Exhibits
Banks of switchboards, where operators used corded plugs to connect callers, are displayed along with working crank telephones. Other historical exhibits include nautical history and artifacts from the first oil well drilled (1865) in California at Petrolia.

Economic Foundations (Farming, Ranching, Dairy, Logging, Craftsman) Exhibits
Exhibits include farming, ranching, and blacksmithing The lumber and dairy industry are also covered.

Native American Exhibits
Native American artifacts, including baskets from the local Wiyot, Yurok, Karuk and Hupa, are exhibited along with interpretive information.

Fine Art
Artwork exhibited include paintings from the 1860s by noted portrait painter Stephen William Shaw.

Publications 
The museum publishes books, videos, and a research-based newsletter.

Selections from the permanent collection

Bosch-Omori seismograph exhibit

Ferndale resident Joseph Jordan Bognuda (2 October 1889 Vacaville, California - 7 January 1979) became interested in earthquakes after living through the 1906 San Francisco which caused considerable damage in Ferndale and over the entire Eel River Valley. Bognuda began a correspondence with Dr. Periz Byerly and attended lectures at the University of California at Berkeley which resulted in the university and the U.S. Coast and Geodetic Survey establishing a Ferndale Seismographic Station with a lighter Bosch-Omori Seismograph than the one in active use at Berkeley at the same time.

Omori Seismographs were developed by Fusakichi Omori, a seismologist at the Imperial University of Tokyo and further refined by J.A. Bosch of Strasbourg who added a damping mechanism.

Bosch-Omori Seismographs are made of two units, one to detect movement North to South and the other East to West. Each has a pendulum which can pivot, restrained by a flexible wire and have a recording needle which traces on smoked paper, controlled by a weight-powered timepiece.

The seismograph parts were shipped from Berkeley to Ferndale and assembled by Bognuda and Horace Winslow of the U.S. Coast and Geodetic Survey in what is now the Ferndale Fire Department building. This new Ferndale Station, abbreviated "FER" - located at  - became active on January 25, 1933.

During the nearly 30 years FER station was in operation, newspapers throughout the U.S. contacted it for information about California earthquakes. With daily observations, Bognuda solved an old puzzle about constantly wiggling traces, by correlating vibrations recorded at FER station to heavy surf on the nearby coast, an effect now called wave-generated microseism.
The FER station became inactive in 1962 when advances in seismic technology rendered it and several others in the state obsolete. The Bosch-Omori seismograph was donated to the city of Ferndale by the university, which moved to the museum in 1981 where it continues to record daily.

Blacksmith shop and forge

A working blacksmith shop and forge displays hundreds of items that made up a local blacksmith shop. Live demonstrations of blacksmithing are given in the shop.

The exhibit is a complete 19th century forge (also known as a Smithy or Blacksmith Shop) originally located in Table Bluff, California. It has over 46 hammers, two anvils, tongs, rasp, wire brushes, chisels, gloves, aprons, a coal and/or coke fired forge, bellows, and numerous other tools of the trade. The shop operated from at least 1875 until 1962 under various owners. Also displayed are 80 cattle branding irons.

Governance

Attendance

In 2022, attendance was around 1,300 in addition to a total of approximately 750 museum memberships.

Finances

The museum is nonprofit and supported privately with memberships, attendance donations, donations, and grants.

Director and board of directors

The museum employs a director who is hired and managed by its board of directors. The museum contracts services for the original research and publication of its research oriented newsletter.

See also 
List of museums in the North Coast (California)

References 

History museums in California
Museums in Humboldt County, California
Buildings and structures in Ferndale, California